"Wild Eyes" is a song by Norwegian electronic music duo Broiler featuring vocals by Belgian singer Ravvel. It was released in Norway in November 2014 and peaked at the top of VG-lista, the official Norwegian Singles Chart in its second week of release. The song's chorus samples a portion of the song "Zonnestraal" by producer and DJ De Hofnar.

Music video
A lyric video was released casting Minna Anke. After a few months a music video was released accompanying Minna Anke and Samuel Armitage. It shows a couple in Hawaii romancing and things happening after they break up. It is a prequel to the lyric video.

Chart performance

Weekly charts

Year-end charts

Certifications

References

2014 songs
DJ Broiler songs
Number-one singles in Norway